Full Speed Ahead may refer to:

Films
 Full Speed Ahead (1936 film), a 1936 British film directed by Lawrence Huntington 
 Full Speed Ahead (1940 film), a 1940 British film directed by John Hunt
 Full Speed Ahead (1951 film), a 1951 Mexican comedy film

Music
 Full Speed Ahead (D.R.I. album), 1995
 Full Speed Ahead, a 1990 album by Larry Mercey
 Full Speed Ahead (Pain album), 1999
 Full Speed Ahead (Táta Vega album), 1976
 Full Speed Ahead, a 2001 album by Autoramas

Other
 The nautical term Full speed ahead
 The oft quoted command Damn the torpedoes, full speed ahead, attributed to Rear Admiral David G. Farragut